Sir Kenneth Brand Harper (8 August 1891 – 21 January 1961) was an English first-class cricketer and businessman. 

He played for Middlesex three times in 1910, before making a single appearance for the Bengal Governor's XI in 1917.

After service with the Royal Marines in World War I, Harper moved to British India.

Harper was a member of the Council of State, the upper house of the British India legislature, between 1928 and 1932.
In 1936, Harper was appointed a director of Burmah Oil, later serving as chairman between 1948 and 1957.

Harper was made a knight bachelor in the 1936 New Year Honours.

He was born in South Kensington; died in Abinger Hammer.

References

1891 births
1961 deaths
English cricketers
Middlesex cricketers
Bengal Governor's XI cricketers
Members of the Council of State (India)